Mister Terrific is the name of two superheroes in the DC Comics Universe.

Versions

Terry Sloane

The Golden Age's Mister Terrific was Terry Sloane, a self-made millionaire whose photographic memory, Olympic-level athletic skills, and mastery of the martial arts made him a Renaissance man. The character first appeared in Sensation Comics #1 (January 1942).

After graduating college at age 13, he eventually became a renowned business leader in the community. Having accomplished all his goals, he felt there were no challenges left for him to pursue, leading him towards suicidal tendencies. However, upon seeing a young woman jump from a bridge, Sloane reacted quickly and saved the woman, Wanda Wilson. Sloane assisted Wanda's brother, who had been caught up in a gang, by adopting a superhero identity: the Mister Terrific persona. This provided him with what he had been missing; a sense of accomplishment. He then created the "Fair Play Club" to stymie growing juvenile delinquency. He also became an active member of the Justice Society of America until the team was dissolved when the House Un-American Activities Committee ordered them to reveal their secret identities or disband. In the end, they chose the latter to protect themselves and their families from potential retribution from those they had fought in the past if their identities became known. Following the dissolution of the JSA, Mr. Terrific retired along with many of the others.

Years later, Sloane came out of retirement and joined with the reformed Justice Society of America. While attending their annual meeting with the Justice League of America, he was killed by his old enemy the Spirit King, who had possessed the body of Jay Garrick to infiltrate the JLA's satellite headquarters.

Michael Holt

In 1997, the mantle of Mister Terrific was passed on to Michael Holt, an equally talented man who holds five black belts, has won the Olympic Decathlon and holds many degrees and doctorates in a wide spectrum of fields. While contemplating suicide after the accidental death of his wife and unborn child, he was met by the Spectre, who told him about Terry Sloane.  Inspired by Sloane's life story, he took the name "Mister Terrific" and later joined the current Justice Society of America, eventually serving as its chairman.  He is the inventor of the T-Sphere, an artificially intelligent miniature device that he controls with his mask and earpieces.  The T-Sphere can fly, create holographic images, project beams of light, release electrical charges, hack into computers and GPS satellites, and constantly cloaks Holt against detection and the recording of his image by any and all technological, non-organic means making him virtually invisible to everything but human line of sight. In the past, he has used them for reconnaissance, infiltration, espionage and information retrieval and storage, often multi-tasking his T-Spheres to all go off on different tasks at once. He can also use his T-Spheres offensively as projectiles and has stated as a threat to an opponent that he can instantly accelerate them to 14 miles per second (50,400 miles per hour) so when it hits them, it would cause a tremendous release of energy, turning around 70% of their corporeal being into super-heated plasma and liquifying the rest. Whether this has ever been tested or was just a bluff is unknown, but considering that his opponent wasn't real, much less alive, Mr. Terrific would have had no moral difficulties in using this option if it came down to it. While in costume, Mr. Terrific has no fewer than three T-Spheres orbiting his body at all times and has had as many as ten. He is also considered the third-smartest man alive.

Holt served as the White King in the restructured Checkmate but eventually returned to full-time duties with the JSA. However, Holt was apparently killed in Justice Society of America #30/31 (Aug/Sept 2009), but returned to the land of the living shortly afterwards.

In 2011, Holt became the title character in his own Mister Terrific comic book, as part of The New 52, but this was a short run, ending in 2012 after eight issues. He has since appeared in the DC book Earth 2 following his series's cancellation, along with the new incarnation of Terry Sloane.

Other
 In Kingdom Come, Alex Ross portrayed a Mister Terrific with oversized guns, shoulder pads, and other military accoutrements. He sported the "Fair Play" logo, but displays little idea of its true and original meanings.
 Another version was portrayed in JSA: The Liberty File and its sequel JSA: The Unholy Three. Here, Terry Sloane was portrayed as a World War II intelligence agent transferred to desk duty, until the untimely death of his fiance by the story's version of the Scarecrow. He was seen wearing a variation of the classic "Fair Play" costume and using a rapier.

Similar characters
 In the JSA All-Stars mini-series chapter focusing on Mister Terrific, Terry's brother Ned appears at a costume ball dressed in an anti-Mister Terrific costume, calling himself Doctor Nil, in order to irritate his brother.
 In Villains United #5, a new villain calling himself Mister Terrible appears as a part of Deathstroke's criminal army, wearing a variation of Holt's Mister Terrific costume.

In other media

Television

Live action
 Terry Sloane appears in the Smallville episode "Absolute Justice", in a painting hanging in the Justice Society of America hall. Michael Holt is mentioned in the Smallville episode "Absolute Justice" (which featured the Justice Society) in the second half by Lois Lane, who mentions that she skipped an interview with him. He is described as a Nobel-winning scientist and tech guru. 
 A character named Curtis Holt appears in the CW series Arrow, played by Echo Kellum. When he is first introduced, Curtis works with Felicity Smoak at Palmer Technology. Like his comic book incarnation, he has created the T-spheres and occasionally wears the Fair Play jacket. Curtis is a big fan of Green Arrow, and after learning that Felicity has a connection with him, he is determined to figure out his identity. In the episode "Beacon of Hope", Curtis joins Team Arrow temporarily and learns the members' identities, helping them to defeat the latest attack of Brie Larvan. In Season 5, Curtis officially joins Team Arrow and begins training to become a vigilante. As a vigilante, Curtis uses the name "Mr. Terrific", which is a homage to his favorite wrestling champion Terry Sloane, who went by the same name in the ring. This version of the character is gay and is depicted as having a husband named Paul (perhaps a gender-swapped version of his wife in the comics, who was named Paula).

Animation
 Michael Holt has made several cameo appearances in the animated TV series Justice League Unlimited. He moves into a more prominent role in the series' final season, becoming the League's Coordinator and responsible for assigning tasks to the various heroes after J'onn J'onzz resigns from active duty. The animated Mr. Terrific is voiced by former Third Watch star Michael Beach.  It is unknown whether Mr. Terrific retains his invisibility to technology, as throughout the show the image of his face appears on several computer screens. His status as one of the world's smartest men is referred to in his full introductory appearance, and the T-Spheres are used in a subsequent episode.
 The original Mister Terrific appears as a nonspeaking character in the Batman: The Brave and the Bold episode "Crisis: 22,300 Miles Above Earth!".
 Michael Holt appears in "Hunted", the premiere episode of Beware the Batman, where he is voiced by Gary Anthony Williams. He is depicted as a businessman who is kidnapped along with Simon Stagg and Alfred Pennyworth by Professor Pyg and Mr. Toad. The three of them are rescued by Batman.
 Mister Terrific appears in Justice League Action episode "The Cube Root", voiced by Hannibal Buress. This version is a former child prodigy who was the college roommate of Martin Stein. Mister Terrific was establishing the science center dedicated to him which Firestorm attends until it is crashed by Calculator who hacks into Mister Terrific's T-Spheres. During Mister Terrific and Firestorm's fight with Calculator upon him causing a blackout, Calculator uses the hacked T-Spheres to split Firestorm back into Ronnie Raymond and Martin Stein where the hacked T-Spheres make off with Ronnie Raymond. This causes Mister Terrific and Martin Stein to work together to rescue Ronnie Raymond using the S-Cubes as a diversion so that Martin Stein can combine with Ronnie Raymond in order to form Firestorm. Mister Terrific and Firestorm reclaim control over the T-Spheres, defeat Calculator, and hand him over to the police. In “The Brain Buster”, he is kidnapped along with other highly intelligent heroes and villains to participate in an initially unknown figure's series of contests to determine who is most intelligent. It is mentioned several times that he is “only” the third-smartest person in the world. In the end, he reveals that he prefers not to call too much attention to himself; he is the one who made the list, and gave himself third place.

Film
 In Justice League: Crisis on Two Earths, a picture of a Parallel Earth version of Mister Terrific, named Mister Horrific, can be seen in the Joker's counterpart computer, as one of Superwoman's made men.
 An alternate universe version of Michael Holt appears in Justice League: Gods and Monsters, voiced by Arif S. Kinchen. He was a scientist who was part of Lex Luthor's "Project Fair Play". While meeting with the other scientists (consisting of Will Magnus, John Henry Irons, Karen Beecher, Pat Dugan, Kimiyo Hoshi, Emil Hamilton, Thomas Morrow, and Stephen Shin), Michael Holt is killed with the other scientists, (with the exception for Will Magnus who secretly orchestrated the attack), by the Metal Men.
The Michael Holt version of Mister Terrific appears in the 2019 DC Universe Original Movie Justice League vs. the Fatal Five, voiced by Kevin Michael Richardson.
The Michael Holt version of Mister Terrific appears in the animated film Injustice voiced by Edwin Hodge. As a departure from the comics, he plays a chess scene with the Man of Steel instead of the Flash. Later Plastic Man releases him at the prison.

Video games
 Mr. Terrific makes a background cameo in the video game Injustice: Gods Among Us. He can be seen in the reactor level of the Watchtower stage. He flies and works on the computer in the center where he is keeping the reactor in check.
 Mr. Terrific is a playable in Lego DC Super-Villains as part of the DC TV Super-Heroes DLC pack.

Miscellaneous
Michael Holt is featured in the Smallville Season 11 digital comic based on the TV series.

Toys
 Mr. Terrific was the third figure released in the eighth wave of the DC Universe Classics line. His accessory was his T-Spheres, which could be placed into his back.
 Mr. Terrific has also received a figure in the Target-exclusive Justice League Unlimited line, packaged on a single card.

References

Articles about multiple fictional characters
Comics characters introduced in 1942
Comics characters introduced in 1997
DC Comics LGBT superheroes
DC Comics martial artists
DC Comics male superheroes
Fictional LGBT characters in television
Fictional gay males